John Sturrock may refer to:

Sir John Sturrock (colonial administrator) (1875–1937), British colonial official
John Sturrock (politician) (1878–1943), British politician and journalist
John Sturrock (rugby union) (1880–1940), Scottish rugby union player
John Sturrock (rower) (1915–1974), English rower
John Sturrock (writer) (1930–2017), English writer, editor, reviewer and translator